Stoughtons Creek is a stream in Greater Madawaska, Renfrew County in Eastern Ontario, Canada. The creek is in the Saint Lawrence River drainage basin.

Calabogie Lake flows via the Madawaska River and the Ottawa River to the Saint Lawrence River.

References

Rivers of Renfrew County